Agustin Kola (born 10 May 1959), is an Albanian professional football coach and retired player.

He played most of his career at 17 Nëntori Tirana where he established himself as one of the greatest strikers of his generation, winning several individual and collective awards. Towards the end of his career, Kola moved for the first time abroad following the fall of communism, by signing with Greece's Egaleo alongside compatriot Adrian Barbullushi. He played there for only one season before returning to the renamed KF Tirana once again to play until his retirement.

Club career
After spending some of his teen years at the Tirana Circus, as an acrobat, and also excelling in swimming, Kola was seen playing football by then middle school teacher Aurel Veria, who referred him to Kola's first coach at KF Tirana's youth, Enver Rada. Kola was then 13 years old. At 14, he excelled at the youth Spartakiad and, given his acrobatic mastery, his role was goalkeeper. However, after his team was losing 0–1, he told one of the defenders to go and become goalie and went himself to attack. Coach Rada didn't have time to recall his undisciplined player because Kola scored the drawing goal, and soon after helped one of his teammates score the winner. From that game on, Kola never played as a goalie anymore, but became a forward.

Without consulting or letting anyone know, at 14, he applied and passed a scrimmage at the Sports mastery school Loro Boriçi, a high school specializing in producing young football players.

Kola will be remembered by the KF Tirana fans as one of its greatest players for the spirit of sacrifice that he would put into the game. Several times Kola played even injured for his team and managed to overturn the fate of the game into a Tirana win. He was part of Nëntori Tirana's golden generation along with players such as Arben Minga, Mirel Josa, Sulejman Mema, Shkëlqim Muça and Bedri Omuri. His partnership up front with Minga made the attacking power of KF Tirana one of the most memorable of the Albanian football. Kola has won 8 Albanian Superliga seasons and 8 Albanian Cups while at KF Tirana.

In Greece, he also played for Kallithea and PAS Giannina.

International career
He made his debut for Albania in a December 1980 FIFA World Cup qualification match at home against Austria and earned a total of 22 caps, scoring 1 goal. His final international was a September 1994 European Championship qualification match against Wales.

Managerial career
Kola's managerial career begun in the 2008–09 season with Tirana, taking charge on 12 December 2008 and leading the team until 7 May, resigning just two matches before the end of the season after losing the 2009 Albanian Cup final to Flamurtari Vlorë. However, the team won their 24th championship with Kola becoming a big factor with his presence as a coach during that season.

Retirement

Charity activities
On 7 May 2015, Kola took part in a charity match played at Elbasan Arena as part of the Albania Legends vs. Germany Legends. He played in the match and notably scored a Panenka-style penalty in the first match as Albania lost 4–3, a photocopy of the 1997 match.

Career statistics

Goals in Albanian Championship

International
Source:

References

External links 

 Sk Tirana fans website

1959 births
Living people
Footballers from Tirana
Albanian footballers
Association football forwards
Albania international footballers
Shkëndija Tiranë players
KF Tirana players
Egaleo F.C. players
PAS Giannina F.C. players
Kallithea F.C. players
Kategoria Superiore players
Albanian expatriate footballers
Albanian expatriate sportspeople in Greece
Expatriate footballers in Greece
Albanian football managers
Shkumbini Peqin managers
KF Tirana managers
FC Kamza managers